On 1 October 2019 five courts of appeal of general jurisdiction and nine courts of cassation of general jurisdiction were created in the Russian Federation, which are operating within the respective judicial district.

Courts of appeal of general jurisdiction are the courts of appeal for the 85 regional courts of Russia. Courts of cassation of general jurisdiction are the courts of cassation for the courts of general jurisdiction and justices of the peace operating in the respective district.

History 
On 13 July 2017, the plenary session of the Supreme Court of Russia adopted a resolution to submit a bill to the State Duma creating separate courts of appeal and cassation courts of general jurisdiction. It is noted that the creation of interregional courts is associated with the need to ensure the independence of the judiciary.

The law was signed by the President of Russia Vladimir Putin on 29 July 2018. The amendments created nine courts of cassation and five appellation courts of general jurisdiction. The day of the commencement of the activities of these courts is established by the plenary session of the Supreme Court no later than 1 October 2019.

List of appellation court districts

List of cassation court districts

Notes

References 

Judiciary of Russia
Judicial districts